Floydtown is an extinct town in Miller County, in the U.S. state of Georgia.

History
According to tradition, the community was named after Thomas S. Floyd, a storekeeper.

References

Geography of Miller County, Georgia
Ghost towns in Georgia (U.S. state)